Shafeek Nader ( 1926–1986) was the first son of Rose Nader, and older brother of Ralph Nader, Laura Nader and Claire Nader. He was a community advocate and the principal founder of Northwestern Connecticut Community College. After his death in 1986, the Shafeek Nader Trust was created in his honor. Nader was a graduate of the University of Toronto.

See also
Joe A. Callaway Award for Civic Courage

References

American people of Lebanese descent
Ralph Nader
1926 births
1986 deaths
Place of death missing
Place of birth missing
University of Toronto alumni
People from Winsted, Connecticut
American expatriates in Canada